Tiran Calvin Porter (born September 26, 1948) is an American bass and guitar player, vocalist and composer, best known as a member of The Doobie Brothers from 1972 to 1980 and 1987 to 1992.

Biography
Porter graduated from Leuzinger High School in Lawndale, California in 1966.  He rose to fame as a member of the Doobie Brothers, replacing bassist Dave Shogren on their second album Toulouse Street in 1972.

His vocals were mostly restricted to the background in the studio, although he wrote and sang "For Someone Special" (a tribute to ill bandleader Tom Johnston) on the album Takin' It To The Streets (1976) and the creatively syncopated "Need A Lady" on the album Livin' On The Fault Line (1977). In concert, Porter usually performed lead vocals on one or two songs.

Porter's most notable contributions to the Doobie Brothers' sound were his busy and punchy bass lines; his distinctive tone permeates all of the band's classic compositions and hits. Often pictured with his trusty Alembic or Gibson basses during the seventies (usually with a Thunderbird or Ripper bass and earlier with an EB-0L), Porter played Fender instruments, most notably the Fender Jazz Bass, along with BC Rich Eagles and Rickenbackers.

His early technique, with rich chordal attack, was based mostly on his picking style, favoring the guitar pick over fingerstyle playing. The hit title track from Takin' It to the Streets, which prominently features Porter's thundering, picked notes, is a prime example of this technique. More recently, even performing the old repertoire with the Doobies, Porter has been playing new, custom-made instruments almost exclusively finger style.

Porter left the Doobies in 1980, citing frustration with the hectic and constant touring schedule. His replacement was session man Willie Weeks, later famous for his collaboration with Michael Jackson and other Quincy Jones protégés. After guesting onstage with his former bandmates briefly during the 1982 farewell tour, he rejoined the Doobies in 1987. Porter played on Cycles (1989), whose title was taken from an unused song he wrote, and Brotherhood (1991). Neither album featured a Porter composition or lead vocal, and his bass is often buried in the mix. After five years of touring in support of Cycles and Brotherhood, Porter finally quit the Doobies for good in 1992. He was reportedly still frustrated with constant touring and the band's preference for recording familiar sounding material instead of his own, more diverse compositions.

Porter released a self-produced solo album, Playing to an Empty House, in 1995. It is a mix of rock, progressive, and jazz spotlighting Porter on all of the instruments and vocals. The album features jazz solos and little or no bass guitar, focusing instead on lead guitar and sequenced keyboards.

More recently, Porter played bass  with singer-songwriter Keith Greeninger from Santa Cruz, California, Beatles tribute band White Album Ensemble, Stormin' Norman and the Cyclones, and Moby Grape during its occasional reunions.

In 2020, Porter was inducted into the Rock and Roll Hall of Fame as a member of The Doobie Brothers.

Albums

Solo
Playing To An Empty House (1995)

With the Doobie Brothers (incomplete)
Toulouse Street (1972) (US #21)
The Captain and Me (1973) (US #7)
What Were Once Vices Are Now Habits (1974) (US #4)
Stampede (1975) (US #4)
Takin' It to the Streets (1976) (US #8)
Livin' on the Fault Line (1977) (US #10)
Minute by Minute (1978) (US #1)
One Step Closer (1980) (US #3)
Cycles (1989) (US #17)
Brotherhood (1991) (US #82)
[[Live at Wolf Trap Live] (2004)Live at the Greek Theater 1982'' [Live] (2011) (guest appearance on one song)

References

External links

1948 births
Living people
American rock bass guitarists
American rock guitarists
American male bass guitarists
The Doobie Brothers members
African-American rock musicians
American rock singers
American funk bass guitarists
African-American male singers
American baritones
20th-century American bass guitarists
20th-century American male musicians
African-American guitarists